Billie Eilish Pirate Baird O'Connell (born December 18, 2001) is an American singer-songwriter. She first gained public attention in 2015 with her debut single "Ocean Eyes", written and produced by her brother Finneas O'Connell, with whom she collaborates on music and live shows. In 2017, she released her debut extended play (EP), titled Don't Smile at Me. Commercially successful, it reached the top 15 of record charts in numerous countries, including the US, UK, Canada, and Australia.

Eilish's first studio album, When We All Fall Asleep, Where Do We Go? (2019), debuted atop the US Billboard 200 and UK Albums Chart. It was one of the best-selling albums of the year, buoyed by the success of its fifth single "Bad Guy", Eilish's first number-one on the US Billboard Hot 100. This made her the first artist born in the 21st century to release a chart-topping single. The following year, Eilish performed the theme song "No Time to Die" for the James Bond film of the same name, which topped the UK Singles Chart and won the Academy Award for Best Original Song in 2022. Her subsequent singles "Everything I Wanted", "My Future", "Therefore I Am", and "Your Power" peaked in the top 10 in the US and UK. Her second studio album, Happier Than Ever (2021), topped charts in 25 countries.

Eilish has received multiple accolades, including seven Grammy Awards, two American Music Awards, two Guinness World Records, three MTV Video Music Awards, three Brit Awards, a Golden Globe Award, and an Academy Award. She is the youngest artist in Grammy history to win all four general field categories—Best New Artist, Record of the Year, Song of the Year, and Album of the Year—in the same year. She was featured on Time magazine's inaugural Time 100 Next list in 2019 and the Time 100 in 2021. According to the Recording Industry Association of America (RIAA) and Billboard, Eilish is the 26th-highest-certified digital singles artist and one of the most successful artists of the 2010s. She has a history of political activism, focusing on climate change awareness and women's equality. She was honored as one of the BBC 100 Women in December 2022.

Early life 

Billie Eilish Pirate Baird O'Connell was born in Los Angeles, California, on December 18, 2001. She is the daughter of actress and teacher Maggie Baird and actor Patrick O'Connell, both of whom are also musicians and work on Eilish's tours. Eilish is of Irish and Scottish descent. She was conceived via in vitro fertilization. Her middle name, Eilish, was originally meant to be her first name, while Pirate was to be her middle name. She was raised in the Highland Park neighborhood of Los Angeles.

Eilish and her brother Finneas were homeschooled by Baird, a decision their parents made to spend time with them and give them the freedom to pursue their interests. Baird taught Eilish and Finneas the basics of songwriting. Eilish said her brother and mother inspired her to get into music. Their parents encouraged the siblings to express themselves and explore whatever they wanted, including art, dancing, and acting. Eilish also performed at talent shows and joined the Los Angeles Children's Chorus at age eight. At age six, she started playing the ukulele. She wrote her first "real" song at age 11 for her mother's songwriting class. The song is about the zombie apocalypse, inspired by the television series The Walking Dead from which she took script lines and episode titles for the song. Eilish had gone on some acting auditions, which she disliked; however, she enjoyed recording background dialogue for crowd scenes and worked on the films Diary of a Wimpy Kid, Ramona and Beezus, and the X-Men series. Eilish also took dance classes until 2016, when a growth plate injury put an end to her dancing career and she turned her focus toward recording music.

Career

2015–2017: Don't Smile at Me 

In 2015, 13-year-old Eilish began working on songs with her brother Finneas, who had been writing and producing for several years and had his own band. The first songs they recorded together were called "She's Broken" and "Fingers Crossed", the former written by Finneas and the latter by Eilish. "We recorded them and put them out on SoundCloud, just for fun," she recalled.

On November 18, 2015, Eilish released the song "Ocean Eyes". The track was written, mixed, and produced by Finneas, who had originally created it for his band the Slightlys, before deciding it would be a better fit for Eilish's vocals. He gave it to Eilish when her dance teacher at the Revolution Dance Center asked them to write a song for choreography. The siblings uploaded the song to SoundCloud, where Diaz could access and download it. The song received several hundred thousand listens in two weeks, and Finneas's manager, Danny Rukasin, reached out to him to discuss Eilish's potential. In Rukasin's opinion, she could achieve significant success with Finneas's help.

In January 2016, Finneas and his manager arranged a deal in which Apple Music signed Eilish to A&R company Platoon, specializing in packaging emerging artists before they get a major-label contract. Eilish then got a publicist, who connected her to the luxury fashion brand Chanel, and a stylist, both of whom helped shape her image. On March 24, 2016, a music video for "Ocean Eyes" directed by Megan Thompson was premiered on Eilish's official YouTube channel. "Ocean Eyes" and Eilish would receive praise and promotion from various media outlets and marketers, including radio stations and music supervisors such as Beats 1, KCRW, BBC One, Zane Lowe, Jason Kramer, Annie Mac, and Chris Douridas.

On June 23, 2016, Eilish and Finneas released "Six Feet Under" through SoundCloud as her second single. A homemade music video for the song was released on June 30, 2016. It was directed by Eilish and edited by her mother, Maggie Baird.

In August 2016, Justin Lubliner, who had noticed Eilish's talent back in 2015 when he first heard "Ocean Eyes", signed her to Darkroom and Interscope Records. He developed her rollout as an artist, taking inspiration from the model of hip hop artists such as Travis Scott and Chance the Rapper, not relying on one big single and focusing on creating a "persona and distinct aesthetic". Darkroom and Interscope Records re-released "Six Feet Under" and "Ocean Eyes" as singles for digital download and streaming on November 17 and 18, 2016, respectively. On November 22, 2016, a dance performance music video for "Ocean Eyes" was uploaded to Eilish's YouTube channel.

On January 14, 2017, Eilish released an EP with four remixes by Astronomyy, Blackbear, Goldhouse, and Cautious Clay for "Ocean Eyes", and released another EP for "Six Feet Under" featuring remixes by Blu J, Gazzo, Jerry Folk, and Aire Atlantica. Following the success of the "Ocean Eyes" remixes, Eilish released "Bellyache" on February 24, 2017, A music video for the song was released on March 22, 2017, and was directed by Miles and AJ. Eilish later released "Bored" on March 30, 2017, as part of the soundtrack to the Netflix series 13 Reasons Why. A music video for "Bored" was later released on June 26, 2017. In March of the same year, Apple Music showcased Eilish at the South by Southwest music festival. On June 30, 2017, Eilish released "Watch". Eilish later released another single, "Copycat", which was released on July 14, 2017, and announced the release of her debut EP, Don't Smile at Me. Eilish later released "Idontwannabeyouanymore" and "My Boy". On August 11, 2017, Eilish released Don't Smile at Me. The EP was a sleeper hit, reaching number 14 on the US Billboard 200. Eilish embarked on the Don't Smile at Me Tour throughout October 2017 in support of her EP. Eilish released "Bitches Broken Hearts" through SoundCloud on November 10, 2017.

Eilish's team worked with Spotify, which promoted her on its most popular playlist, "Today's Top Hits". The Baffler described Eilish's sound as fitting into the "streambait" genre consisting of largely "mid-tempo, melancholy pop" influenced by Lana Del Rey, whose "singing style, bleakness, and... hip-hop influenced production" shaped the aesthetic. Eilish's commercial success expanded with her Spotify promotion. In September 2017, Apple Music named Eilish their Up Next artist, which followed with a short documentary, a live session EP and an interview with Zane Lowe on Apple Music's radio station Beats 1. That month, the live EP titled Up Next Session: Billie Eilish was released. On December 15, 2017, Eilish released her collaboration with American rapper Vince Staples titled "&Burn", which is a remix of her previously released single "Watch". It was later included on the expanded edition of Don't Smile at Me.

 2018–2020: When We All Fall Asleep, Where Do We Go? 

In February 2018, Eilish embarked on her second headlining concert tour, the Where's My Mind Tour, which concluded in April 2018. "Bitches Broken Hearts" was re-released worldwide on March 30, 2018. For Record Store Day 2018, Eilish released "Party Favor" on a pink 7-inch vinyl, along with a cover of "Hotline Bling", written by Canadian rapper Drake as the B-side. Eilish collaborated with American singer Khalid for the single "Lovely", which was released on April 19, 2018, and added to the soundtrack for the second season of 13 Reasons Why. She later released "You Should See Me in a Crown", in July 2018, In July of the same year, Eilish performed at the Mo Pop Festival.

On the day of release for her single "When the Party's Over", Eilish was featured in Vanity Fairs "73 Questions" rapid-fire questionnaire video series by Joe Sabia who revisited a previous interview from October 2017. The resulting video was a side-by-side time capsule of both interviews showing her growth in popularity over one year. She signed a talent contract with Next Management for fashion and beauty endorsements in October 2018. She was placed on the 2018 Forbes 30 Under 30 list in November of that year, and released the single "Come Out and Play" in November 2018, which was written for a holiday-themed Apple commercial. In early January 2019, Don't Smile at Me reached 1 billion streams on Spotify, making her the youngest artist to top 1 billion streams on a project. That month, Eilish released "Bury a Friend" as the third single from her debut album When We All Fall Asleep, Where Do We Go?, along with "When I Was Older", a single inspired by the 2018 film Roma, which appeared on the compilation album Music Inspired by the Film Roma. In February, Eilish partnered with YouTube for a documentary mini-series titled "A Snippet Into Billie's Mind". "Wish You Were Gay", her fourth single from the album, was released on March 4, 2019.When We All Fall Asleep, Where Do We Go? was released on March 29, 2019. Spotify launched a "multi-level campaign behind the album", creating a multi-media playlist and "new product features" that Spotify stated "allow for vertical video content, custom assets, and editorial storylines all with the goal of creating more meaningful and engaging context for [Eilish's] fans." In Los Angeles, Spotify set up a "pop-up enhanced album experience", which included different artwork and a "multi-sensory" experience of each track for fans. The album debuted atop the Billboard 200 as well as on the UK Albums Chart, making Eilish the first artist born in the 2000s to have a number-one album in the United States, and the youngest female ever to have a number-one album in the United Kingdom. Upon the album's debut, Eilish broke the record for most simultaneously charting Hot 100 songs by a female artist, with 14, after every song from the album, excluding "Goodbye", charted on the Hot 100. The fifth single from the album, "Bad Guy", was released in conjunction with the album. A remix of the song featuring Justin Bieber was released in July 2019. In August, Bad Guy peaked at number-one in the US, ending Lil Nas X's record-breaking 19 weeks at number-one with "Old Town Road". She is the first artist born in the 2000s and the youngest artist since Lorde (with "Royals") to have a number-one single.

Eilish began her When We All Fall Asleep Tour at Coachella Festival in April 2019, with the tour concluding on November 17, 2019, in Mexico City. In August 2019, Eilish partnered with Apple Music for Music Lab: Remix Billie Eilish, part of Apple Stores' Music Lab sessions during which fans deconstruct her song "You Should See Me In A Crown" and learn how to create their own remix on Apple devices and GarageBand. On September 27, 2019, Eilish announced her Where Do We Go? World Tour. The tour began in Miami on March 9, 2020, and ran for two more shows on March 10 in Orlando and March 12 in Raleigh respectively, before Eilish ended the tour prematurely due to the COVID-19 pandemic. The tour was set to conclude in Jakarta on September 7.

On November 7, 2019, Jack White's Third Man Records announced that the label would be releasing an acoustic live album of Eilish's performance from the record label's Blue Room, exclusively sold on vinyl at Third Man retail locations in Nashville, Tennessee, and Detroit, Michigan. On November 13, 2019, she released her next single, "Everything I Wanted". On November 20, 2019, Eilish was nominated for six Grammy Awards including Record of the Year and Song of the Year for "Bad Guy" as well as Album of the Year and Best New Artist. At age 17, she became the youngest artist to be nominated in all four General Field categories. In the same month, Eilish was crowned 2019's Billboard Woman of the Year.

On January 14, 2020, Eilish was announced as performer of the title track for the 25th installment in the James Bond film franchise, No Time to Die, written and produced with her brother. With this announcement, Eilish became the youngest artist to write and perform a James Bond theme song. Shortly after, it became the second Bond theme song to top the British official charts and the first Bond theme performed by a female artist to do so. It was also Eilish's first number-one single in the UK. At the 62nd Grammy Awards, she became the youngest person to win the four main Grammy categories – Best New Artist, Record of the Year, Song of the Year, and Album of the Year – in the same year. During the COVID-19 pandemic, Eilish and her brother performed for both iHeart Media's Living Room Concert for America, and Global Citizen's Together at Home concert series, singing a cover of Bobby Hebb's "Sunny" for the latter. Both virtual concerts were an effort to raise awareness and funds towards fighting the disease. On April 10, 2020, "Ilomilo" was sent to Italian contemporary hit radio stations by Universal Music Group, as When We All Fall Asleep, Where Do We Go?s seventh and final single. On July 30, 2020, Eilish released "My Future", her first original release since "No Time to Die", along with an animated video. In 2020, she became the youngest person to feature on the Forbes Celebrity 100 list, with earnings of $53 million. In September 2020, Eilish released a collection of branded ukuleles with guitar manufacturer Fender.

In October 2020, Eilish announced a livestream concert titled Where Do We Go? The Livestream set to air from Los Angeles on October 24 of that same year, with proceeds from the show's merchandise raising funds to support event crew members affected by the COVID-19 pandemic. In a Vanity Fair interview, Eilish said she was working on "sixteen new songs and lov[ing] them all", revealing an upcoming musical project. Eilish won three Billboard Music Awards on October 24—Billboard Music Award for Top Female Artist, Billboard Music Award for Top Billboard 200 Album (When We All Fall Asleep, Where Do We Go?), and Billboard Music Award for Top New Artist—out of the 12 that she was nominated for. In that same month, she also announced a new single, entitled "Therefore I Am", which was released along with its music video on November 12, 2020. Eilish performed "Therefore I Am" and "My Future" at the Jingle Ball in December 2020.

 2021–present: Happier Than Ever and Guitar Songs 

"Lo Vas a Olvidar", a single featuring Rosalía as a part of HBO's Euphoria soundtrack, was released in January 2021, almost two years after initially teasing the song. The R. J. Cutler–directed documentary film Billie Eilish: The World's a Little Blurry was released on Apple TV+ and in select movie theaters. The film was praised by critics and fans for its in-depth look at Eilish's personal life during her ascension to fame. At the 63rd Annual Grammy Awards, Eilish took home two awards: the Grammy Award for Best Song Written for Visual Media, for her Bond theme and the Grammy Award for Record of the Year for her 2019 single "Everything I Wanted". In her acceptance speech for Record of the Year, Eilish said that Megan Thee Stallion "deserved to win", but still thanked her fans and her brother Finneas for her award.

On April 27, 2021, Eilish announced on her Instagram account that her second album, Happier Than Ever, would be released on July 30, and the tracklist was made available on Apple Music. The album was released on various formats, including collectable vinyl and cassette colours. The album's release was preceded by five singles: "My Future", "Therefore I Am", "Your Power", "Lost Cause", and "NDA", and was accompanied by the title track. On December 2, 2021, Eilish announced an eco-friendly limited-edition vinyl version of Happier Than Ever made from recycled vinyl scraps. The collector's item was only made available at a number of Gucci stores around the world and included Gucci-branded nail stickers designed by the brand's creative director Alessandro Michele. To further promote the album, Eilish worked with Disney+ for the concert film Happier Than Ever: A Love Letter to Los Angeles, released in September 2021, and embarked on the Happier Than Ever, The World Tour, which began in February 2022.

In June 2021, Eilish was criticized for videos in which she mouthed the anti-Asian slur "chink" while lip-syncing the song "Fish" by Tyler, the Creator, and for using blaccent and African-American Vernacular English. Eilish was also accused of queerbaiting after using the caption "I love girls" to promote the music video for "Lost Cause". On June 22, she posted an apology to Instagram stories for her usage of "chink", saying that she was "appalled and embarrassed" by the video and that she was "13 or 14" at the time and did not know the slur was a derogatory term. She also addressed a separate video of what was viewed as her mocking an Asian accent, writing that she was actually "speaking in a silly gibberish made up voice". Reflecting on the events in a July 2021 interview, Eilish stated: "I said so many things then that I totally don't agree with now, or think the opposite thing. The weirdest thing is how nothing ever goes away once it's on the internet ... When you're a fucking teenager, you don't really know yourself ... I didn't actually know how I really felt. So I just came up with this facade that I stuck to."

Eilish started formulating ideas for her third studio album's songs with Finneas in December 2021. In a July 2022 interview with Zane Lowe for Apple Music, she commented that she hoped to start writing the album in 2023. During 2022, Eilish became the youngest headliner to date for two festivals, specifically Glastonbury and Coachella. The Pixar film Turning Red was released that year, for which she and Finneas wrote three songs. These are "Nobody Like U", "U Know What's Up" and "1 True Love", which are performed by Turning Red fictional boy band 4*Town. 

In June 2022, during her world tour's Manchester show, Eilish debuted the then-unreleased ballad "TV". The song references the overturning of Roe v. Wade, a case which made abortion a constitutional right in the US. The next month, on July 21, she surprise-released the two-track EP Guitar Songs, which includes "TV" alongside "The 30th". Eilish explained her decision to surprise-release the EP during the interview with Lowe. She told him that while work on her third studio album was coming soon, she refused to wait until that time to put "TV" and "The 30th" on a track list. She wanted to spread their messages to her fans as soon as possible, noting the immediacy of its lyrics: "These songs are really current for me, and they’re songs that I want to have said right now." Another reason was Eilish had grown tired of doing heavy, traditional promotion for upcoming music. She wanted to release songs like she had been doing early in her career, previewing them for fans in live concerts before releasing them without much marketing.

Eilish worked with Apple Music to exclusively host a film of one of the Happier Than Ever tour concerts, specifically one of her shows at the O2 Arena in London. She billed the film as a way for fans who missed out on tickets to experience the tour for themselves, wanting more people to recognize her for her showmanship live. Two concerts, titled Happier Than Ever, The Hometown Encore, were held at the Kia Forum in Inglewood, California from December 15 to 16, 2022.

Eilish made her acting debut on Amazon Prime Video's Swarm. She played the role of Eva, the leader of a cult inspired by NXIVM.

 Artistry 

 Musical style, songwriting, and music videos 

Eilish possesses a soprano vocal range. Avery Stone of Noisey described her vocals as "ethereal", and Maura Johnston of Rolling Stone characterized them as "whispery". Doreen St. Félix of The New Yorker opined that she has a "husky, slurring voice that she can thin out to reedy". Music critic Robert Christgau wrote that while Eilish is musically and commercially pop, her brand also "reminds us how amorphous [pop] has become", describing her soprano as "too diminutive for vocal calisthenics", adding that her "playful version of teen-goth angst" and "electro-saturated debut album" captivated a diverse audience. Her music incorporates pop, dark pop, electropop, emo pop, experimental pop, goth-pop, indie pop, teen pop, and alt-pop.

Eilish and her brother, Finneas, collaborate on songwriting. Finneas writes for Eilish's albums, produces her music, and also performs in live shows. Eilish and Finneas "like to completely make up things and become characters" and "have songs that are really fictional". Eilish said a number of the songs also derive from her and Finneas' experiences. They try to write "really interesting and conversational" lyrics: "We try to say stuff that doesn't have to be that deep [...] but you say something way deeper in a certain way that makes sense, but you haven't really thought about." Finneas has stated that when he writes for his sister, he aims to "write [songs] that I think she'll relate to and enjoy singing and empathise with the lyrics and make her own". When he writes with Eilish, he tries "to help her tell whatever story she's trying to tell, bounce ideas off of her, listen to her ideas", and use a language that fits her voice telling the story.

Eilish had wanted to direct her own music videos since age 14 but was initially not given the opportunity due to lack of experience. In 2019, she made her directorial debut with the video for her song "Xanny".

 Influences 
Eilish grew up listening to the Beatles, Justin Bieber, Green Day, Arctic Monkeys, Linkin Park and Lana Del Rey. She has said that stumbling upon Aurora's "Runaway" on YouTube inspired her to pursue a music career. Hip hop is her favorite genre and biggest inspiration. Eilish has cited Tyler, the Creator, Childish Gambino, and Avril Lavigne as major musical and style influences for her. Other influences include Adele, Earl Sweatshirt, James Blake, Amy Winehouse, the Spice Girls, Lorde, Marina and the Diamonds, Britney Spears, Taylor Swift, Nicki Minaj, XXXTentacion, and Twenty One Pilots. Eilish has also named Rihanna as an inspiration for her style choices after she called fashion her "defense mechanism" during an acceptance speech. She has also credited Damon Albarn for changing the way she views art and music creation.

Eilish has been compared in the media to Lavigne, Lorde and Del Rey, the last of whom she says she does not want to be compared to, stating, "That woman [Del Rey] has made her brand so perfect for her whole career and she shouldn't have to hear that." Eilish said that Ariana Grande's 2019 album Thank U, Next inspired her to continue making music.

 Public image and recognitions 

Eilish is the recipient of numerous awards, including seven Grammy Awards, two American Music Awards, two MTV Europe Music Awards, three MTV Video Music Awards, an Academy Award (Oscar), two Guinness World Records, one Brit Award, and three Billboard Music Awards.

In 2019, Time placed her on their inaugural "Time 100 Next" list. She is the youngest person, second person ever, and first female artist to win the four main Grammy categories—Best New Artist, Record of the Year, Song of the Year, and Album of the Year—in the same year. In 2022, she became the first person born in the 21st century ever to win an Academy Award, receiving the award for Best Original Song for "No Time to Die" from the James Bond film of the same name. In 2023, Rolling Stone ranked Eilish at number 198 on its list of the 200 Greatest Singers of All Time.

 Style 
Much of the media attention surrounding Eilish has revolved around her fashion style, which consists primarily of baggy, oversized clothing. In 2017, she stated that she likes dressing out of her comfort zone to feel like she grabs the attention of everyone around her. She tries to be "really different from a lot of people" and dresses opposite to what others wear. Aiming to "look memorable", Eilish said that she "proved to people that [she's] more important than they think" and likes being "kind of intimidating, so people will listen up." In 2019, she stated: "Over time it's kind of become a thing, 'Billie Eilish, the creepy, weird, scary girl.' And I don't like that. It's lame. I just don't want to stay one thing."

In May 2019, Eilish appeared in a Calvin Klein advertisement, where she mentioned that she dresses in baggy clothes to prevent people from judging her body. In a March 2020 live show in Miami, as part of the Where Do We Go? Tour, she premiered Not My Responsibility, a short film which addresses her experiences of body shaming. Not My Responsibility was later uploaded to Eilish's YouTube channel in May 2020.

Eilish was on the cover of the June 2021 issue of British Vogue. The photoshoot by Craig McDean featured her dressed in lingerie, specifically focused on corsets. Eilish made her first appearance at the Met Gala in 2021, which had the theme "In America: A Lexicon of Fashion", wearing an Oscar de la Renta gown under the condition that the fashion house would permanently end its use of real fur. Though the dress was inspired by the original Barbie doll, fashion critics observed its likeness to Golden Age star Marilyn Monroe, who also wore a tulle Oscar de la Renta gown in the early 1950s.

 Products and endorsements 
In April 2019, Eilish released clothing in collaboration with Takashi Murakami, inspired by her music video for "You Should See Me in a Crown", also directed and animated by Murakami, as well as a limited edition vinyl figure of herself from the video. Eilish also collaborated with Adobe Creative Cloud the same month for a series of advertisements as well as a social media art contest, where users would submit artwork with the hashtag "#BILLIExADOBE".

Eilish appeared in the debut of Calvin Klein's #MyCalvins ad campaign in May 2019, as well as the Ad Council's "Seize the Awkward" campaign, a series of public service announcements targeting mental health awareness. She fronted MCM Worldwide's fall 2019 advertising campaign in July 2019, and later that month, collaborated with Los Angeles-based clothing brand Freak City for a clothing line. Also in July 2019, she performed at a dinner hosted by Chanel on Shelter Island to celebrate the brand's pop-up yacht club.

In August 2019, Eilish partnered with Apple to allow Apple Store customers to experiment with her song "You Should See Me in a Crown" in Music Lab sessions in its stores. Eilish's collaboration with the clothing company Siberia Hills was met with controversy after it was revealed that the company had used plagiarized designs of fan art of the character Nozomi Tojo from Love Live!, drawn by artist Makoto Kurokawa, for Eilish's clothing line. The brand later clarified that Eilish herself had no knowledge of the plagiarism.

In November 2021, she  debuted "Eilish", her perfume brand, which is  vegan and cruelty-free.

 Advocacy 
Eilish has a history of political activism, publicly expressing her views on a multitude of political issues. She has been vocal with regards to environmental causes, including climate change awareness. Among other pursuits, Eilish signed an open letter to world leaders urging them to take action against climate-induced poverty, embarked on an ad campaign encouraging young people to use technology for environmental advocacy, and hosted a six-day climate seminar in London titled Overheated to discuss topics such as sustainable fashion and youth activism. Her 2019 single "All the Good Girls Go to Hell" centers around climate change and uses heaven-and-hell imagery to criticize ignorance about rising sea levels, and she permitted the non-profit CoralWatch to use "Ocean Eyes" as part of an online awareness campaign about Australia's Great Barrier Reef. Eilish was raised as a vegetarian, is a regular advocate on social media for animal rights and veganism, and has criticized the dairy, wool, and mink fur industries. 

Eilish has spoken in multiple occasions about women's rights. A supporter of body positivity, she wrote and produced the 2020 short film Not My Responsibility as a response against body shaming towards her and the double standards placed upon women's appearances. "Your Power", one of her 2021 singles, criticizes the sexual exploitation of young women, primarily by men who hold power over them. Eilish associates herself with the US abortion rights movement; she expressed rage when Texas implemented its anti-abortion laws in 2021. During the 2022 Glastonbury festival, she performed "Your Power" to condemn the overturning of Roe v. Wade. She spoke of the decision: "Today is a really, really dark day for women in the U.S. I'm just going to say that as I cannot bear to think about it any longer in this moment." She included a reference to Roe v. Wade overturning in her 2022 track "TV", much of which she wrote after a draft of the court decision was leaked online in May.

In March 2020, Eilish encouraged fans online to register to vote for the 2020 US presidential election. In August 2020, she performed at the 2020 Democratic National Convention and announced her endorsement of Joe Biden's presidential campaign.

 Personal life 
Eilish previously lived with her parents in the Highland Park neighborhood of Los Angeles until 2019, when she moved out. She said in 2021 that she still spends many nights in her childhood bedroom to be close to her parents. She stated she has Tourette syndrome, synesthesia, and has experienced depression. This included an incident where she had planned her own suicide, which she said that a friend, the late American rapper/singer XXXTentacion, stopped her from going through with.

Eilish experienced sexual abuse from someone older than her when she was a child, and she has refused to disclose specific details about it.

Eilish dated rapper Brandon Adams, who goes by the stage name 7:AMP. They have since broken up. In late October 2022, it was reported that Eilish was dating fellow singer Jesse Rutherford.

 Discography 

 When We All Fall Asleep, Where Do We Go? (2019)
 Happier Than Ever'' (2021)

Tours

Headlining 
 Don't Smile at Me Tour (2017)
 Where's My Mind Tour (2018)
 1 by 1 Tour (2018–2019)
 When We All Fall Asleep Tour (2019)
 Where Do We Go? World Tour (2020)
 Happier Than Ever, The World Tour (2022–2023)

Opening act 
 Florence and the Machine – High as Hope Tour (2018–2019)

Filmography

See also 
 List of artists who reached number one in the United States
 List of American Grammy Award winners and nominees
 List of most-followed Instagram accounts
 List of most-streamed artists on Spotify
 List of most-subscribed YouTube channels
 List of vegans

References

External links 

 
 
 
 

 
2001 births
Living people
21st-century American singers
21st-century American women singers
American child singers
American indie pop musicians
American people of Irish descent
American people of Scottish descent
American sopranos
American women in electronic music
American women pop singers
American women singer-songwriters
Art pop musicians
Best Original Song Academy Award-winning songwriters
Brit Award winners
California Democrats
Child pop musicians
Electropop musicians
Golden Globe Award-winning musicians
Grammy Award winners
Interscope Records artists
Juno Award for International Album of the Year winners
MTV Europe Music Award winners
NME Awards winners
Musicians from Los Angeles
People with Tourette syndrome
Singer-songwriters from California
Singers from Los Angeles
BBC 100 Women